The following is an incomplete list of gothic festivals, which encapsulates music festivals focused on gothic music. Goth festivals may feature genres such as gothic rock and gothic metal, as well as industrial music. The festivals also tend to feature aspects of the Goth subculture, such as fans and bands in goth fashion. Goth is a musical subgenre of post-punk and alternative rock that formed during the late-1970s. Gothic rock bands grew from the strong ties they had to the English punk rock and emerging post-punk scenes. The genre itself was defined as a separate movement from post-punk due to its darker music accompanied by introspective and romantic lyrics. Gothic rock then gave rise to a broader subculture that included clubs, fashion and publications in the 1980s.

Festivals

Gallery

See also

Related lists
List of music festivals
List of industrial music festivals
List of punk rock festivals
List of heavy metal festivals
List of electronic dance music festivals

Related categories
 Goth festivals
 Rock festivals
 Punk rock festivals
 Electronic music festivals
 Heavy metal festivals

References

External links

Goth festivals
Gothic
Articles containing video clips
Gothic
Gothic
Gothic